Grammarly is an American cloud-based typing assistant. It reviews spelling, grammar, punctuation, clarity, engagement, and delivery mistakes in English texts, detects plagiarism, and suggests replacements for the identified errors. It also allows users to customize their style, tone, and context-specific language.

Grammarly was launched in 2009 by Alex Shevchenko, Max Lytvyn, and Dmytro Lider. It's available as a standalone application for use with desktop programs, a browser extension optimized for Google Docs, and a smartphone keyboard.

Grammarly is developed by Grammarly Inc., with hubs in San Francisco, California, and offices in Kyiv, New York City, Vancouver, and Berlin.

History 

Grammarly was founded by Max Lytvyn, Alex Shevchenko, and Dmytro Lider, the creators of My Dropbox, an app that checks essays for plagiarism. Grammarly was initially designed as an educational app to help university students improve their English skills. It was later offered to the end customers who use English in everyday life.

In early 2018, a security researcher at Google discovered a vulnerability in Grammarly's browser extension beta version, which exposed authentication tokens to websites and potentially allowed them to access the users' documents and other data. In a few hours, the company released a hotfix and reported that it found no evidence of compromised user data. Later in December, Grammarly launched a bug bounty program on HackerOne, offering a 100,000 reward to the first white hat hacker to access a specific document on the company's server.

Being a company with Ukrainian roots, Grammarly effectively cut all business relations with users in Russia and Belarus in response to the 2022 Russian invasion of Ukraine. The company also announced that it would donate the net revenue earned in Russia and Belarus since 2014 to Ukraine. It also provided free access to Ukrainian media, which reported on the war in English.

Reception 
Reviewers have praised Grammarly for its ease of use and helpful suggestions, considering it worthwhile despite its relatively high price and lack of offline functionality. Josh Steimle of Forbes lauded it in 2013, saying that "It's an online  that quickly and easily makes your writing better and makes you sound like a pro, or at least helps you avoid looking like a fool." However, some users have criticized Grammarly for incorrect suggestions, ignorance of tone and context, and reduction of writers' freedom of expression.

See also

LanguageTool

References

Cloud applications
Nonfree Firefox WebExtensions
Google Chrome extensions
Grammar checkers
Internet properties established in 2009
Spell checkers
2009 establishments in California
Plagiarism detectors
Common Lisp (programming language) software
Android virtual keyboards
Software companies of Ukraine
YouTube sponsors